Liberian cuisine is centered on the consumption of rice, cassava, plantain, yam, tropical fruits and vegetables (potatoes, greens, cassava leaf, okra, cabbage), as well as fish, meat, and more.

Liberia also has a tradition of baking, including cornbread, sour bread, rice bread, banana bread, and cakes.

Dietary staples

Starches
Rice is a staple of the Liberia diet, whether commercial or country ("swamp rice"), and either served "dry" (without a sauce), with stew or soup poured over it, cooked into the classic jollof rice, or ground into a flour to make country breh (bread). Cassava is processed into several types of similar starchy foods: fufu, dumboy, and GB (or geebee). Eddoes (taro root) is also eaten.

Fruits and vegetables
Popular Liberian ingredients include cassava, bananas, citrus fruit, sweet or regular plantains, coconut, okra and sweet potatoes. Heavy stews spiced with habanero and scotch bonnet chillies are popular and eaten with fufu. Potato greens, the leafy plant of the sweet potato, is widely grown and consumed, as is bitterball (a small vegetable similar to eggplant), and okra.

Other popular stews, referred to as "soups", are toborghee, bitterleaf, cassava leaf and palaver sauce. Toborghee consists of African eggplants which are stewed and spiced with fermented palm oil. It is often bitter in taste and typically associated with the Lorma people inhabiting the area of Lofa.

Bitterleaf, referred to as "bittas" by the Sierra Leoneans, consists of bitter leaves mixed with ground melon seeds.

Cassava leaf, referred to as "gbassajama", is made from ground cassava leaves. The leaves are then braised and tenderized in a broth and mixed together with red palm oil stock.

Palaver sauce consists of jute leaves, also referred to as "plateau", that are stewed in a broth.

Fish and meat
Fish is one of the key animal protein sources in Liberia, with a 1997 study noting that in the Upper Guinea countries (of which Liberia is one), fish made up 30–80% of animal proteins in the diet. However, studies have noted that in that region, consumption of fish actually declined from the 1970s to the 1990s due to "land and catchments degradation". Small dried fishes are known as bodies or bonnies.

Bushmeat
Bushmeat is widely eaten in Liberia, and is considered a delicacy. A 2004 public opinion survey found that bushmeat ranked second behind fish amongst Monrovians as a preferred source of protein. Of households where bushmeat was served, 80% of residents said they cooked it "once in a while", while 13% cooked it once a week and 7% cooked bushmeat daily. The survey was conducted during the last civil war, and bushmeat consumption is now believed to be far higher.

Endangered species are hunted for human consumption in Liberia. Species hunted for food in Liberia include elephants, pygmy hippopotamus, chimpanzees, leopards, duikers, and various types of monkeys.

Alcohol
While Liberia produces, imports, and consumes some standard beers and liquors, the traditional palm wine made from fermenting palm tree sap is popular. Palm wine can be drunk as is, used as a yeast substitute in bread, or used as vinegar after it has soured. A local rum is also made from sugarcane, and called "cane juice" or gana gana.

References

 
West African cuisine